Alekseyevka is a village and municipality in the Khachmaz Rayon of Azerbaijan.  It has a population of 1,373.

References 

Populated places in Khachmaz District